The Battle of Long Island was a significant British victory in the early stages of the American Revolutionary War over American forces under the command of General George Washington, and the opening battle in a successful British campaign to gain control of New York City in 1776.  The Americans had lined New York's harbor with various levels of entrenchment and fortification, which were defended by an array of Continental Army forces and militia companies from New York and nearby states.  After the British made an unopposed landing on Long Island in mid-August, Washington reinforced forward positions in the hills of central Brooklyn.

The British forces were led by Lieutenant General William Howe, and included veterans of the Siege of Boston, new regiments from Ireland, and hired German troops from Hesse-Kassel.  On August 27, 1776, Howe made a successful flanking maneuver around the American left while occupying the American right with diversionary battle.  As a result, a significant portion of the American army became entrapped and surrendered after its retreat to the entrenched position was cut off.  With a siege of the position looming, General Washington successfully withdrew his remaining army to Manhattan in the early hours of August 29.

Key
 Unit: this column identifies the unit being described or summarized.  Divisions, the largest unit of aggregation (called "Lines" in the British order of battle) are identified by bold text centered in a darker background spanning the table.  Brigades, the intermediate unit size, are identified only by bold text.  The brigades are composed of smaller units, usually regiments or battalions, but sometimes including formations as small as companies.  Unless otherwise noted, a smaller unit falls within the command hierarchy of a preceding larger unit.
 Commander: the field commander of the unit on the day of the battle.
 Unit size: the reported size of the unit.  This number does not normally include the officers of the unit.
 Casualties: a listing of the casualties the unit incurred, to the level documented.  In the Other column, number of captured are followed by the letter C, and number of missing by the letter M.
 Notes: other notes about the unit, possibly including further details about its place of origin and its movements in the battle theater.

British and Hessian forces
The British Army at the start of the campaign was drawn from three sources.  The first was troops that had been in the Siege of Boston, which ended when the British evacuated their troops from the city to Halifax, Nova Scotia in March 1776.  The second was new levies raised in the British Isles, including a significant number of Irish troops.  The third was troops provided by several small German principalities of the Holy Roman Empire.  After the war broke out in 1775, the British government realized that it would need more troops than it could raise on its own to fight the war, so it sought to hire troops from willing third parties in Europe.  Only a few German rulers were willing to provide troops.  The single largest contingent, with more than 12,000 arriving in North America in 1776, came from the Landgraviate of Hessen-Kassel.  All of the German troops with the British at the start of the New York campaign were from Hesse-Kassel, and were under the command of Lt. Gen. Leopold Philip von Heister.  A regiment from Waldeck that was also destined for the New York theater did not arrive until after Manhattan was occupied.

Some of the troops sent from Europe had first been directed at operations in the southern colonies, under the direction of Lt. Gen. Henry Clinton.  The expedition attempted to occupy Charleston, South Carolina, but was repulsed in the June Battle of Sullivan's Island; it then sailed for New York to join the army as it gathered on Staten Island in July and August.  Clinton served as General Howe's second in command.

It was common practice at this time for regiments of the British Army to include companies of light infantry and grenadiers, composed of troops with specialized abilities and training.  When an army was assembled, these companies were often separated from their regiments and formed into separate light infantry and grenadier battalions.

The Royal Navy, despite dominating the harbor, played only a limited role in the battle. HMS Roebuck penetrated as far as Red Hook on August 26, but her guns never came within range of American positions.  The navy did provide some logistical support for the battle.  It resupplied General James Grant's troops with gunpowder and ammunition late in the battle, and also landed 2,000 Royal Marines to share in the victory.

The primary source for this data is a return of troops prepared by General Howe on August 22, 1776, five days before the battle, and presented by historian David Hackett Fischer.  Howe's report did not include a breakdown of individual unit sizes.  Although a more detailed return for August 27 appears to have once existed, none of the listed sources reproduces it.  According to a summary of that return, the strength of the British land forces under Howe's command was 24,464 fit for duty.  This number does not include a brigade of Loyalists raised by Oliver De Lancey, Sr., or the marines, who were not under Howe's command.  Howe's headcount, including officers and those unfit for duty, came to 31,625.  The casualty figures for British units are from a casualty-only return prepared by General Howe, reprinted by Field.  It includes a detailed breakdown by unit of British casualties, and a summary of Hessian casualties.

British units

Hessian units

Royal Navy 
Although the Royal Navy squadron in New York were not directly involved in the battle, the ships in the area were:

 Royal Navy Squadron in New York
 HMS Asia (64 guns)
 HMS Renown (50 guns)
 HMS Preston (50 guns)
 HMS Phoenix (44 guns)
 HMS Roebuck (44 guns)
 HMS Repulse (32 guns)
 HMS Orpheus (32 guns)
 HMS Carysfort (28 guns)
 HMS Rose (20 guns)

American forces
The troops arrayed to oppose the British were primarily from regiments of the Continental Army, although there were a large number of militia units from New York, Connecticut, New Jersey, and Pennsylvania in the field as well.  A significant number of the Continentals had participated in the Siege of Boston, after which they had moved to join troops already in New York preparing its defenses.  Some troops had participated in the expeditions against Quebec begun in fall 1775.  That attempt ended in June 1776 after a disastrous retreat to Fort Ticonderoga prompted by the arrival of a large British force at Quebec City, and some of those troops were then rushed south to assist in New York.  The American defense of Long Island became complicated when Major General Nathanael Greene fell ill on August 15.  He had directed the defense work on Long Island, and was thus the general most familiar with the terrain.  Washington replaced him on August 20 with Major General John Sullivan, lately returned from Ticonderoga.  After sending reinforcements onto Long Island on August 25, Washington replaced Sullivan with the ranking major general, Israel Putnam.  David Hackett Fischer observes that the American command situation was "[s]o tangled [...] that units were uncertain about their commanders and not sure of the positions they were to defend."

The basis for this order of battle is a return prepared by General Washington on August 3.  It encompasses all of the units stationed in the New York area, not only those involved in the battle.  The total provided is a listing of all troops, not just those listed as ready for duty.  A substantial number of troops were sick during July and August.  For example, General William Heath, writing in his memoirs, recorded that about 10,000 men were sick on August 8, and Washington reported on September 2 having fewer than 20,000 men present and fit for duty.  Later returns were apparently impossible: Washington wrote to Congress on August 26 that "[t]he shifting and changing which the regiments have undergone of late has prevented their making proper returns, and of course puts it out of my power to transmit a general one of the army."

The notes for each unit give some indication of where it was stationed, and what sort of movements it made, especially between August 22 and 29, a time period in which there were several significant movements and reassignments of troops.  A number of units were moved from Manhattan to Long Island after the British landing on Long Island, and more were sent over during and after the fighting to bolster the defenses before they were finally abandoned on August 29.

Detailed American casualties are not available because many of the relevant records were destroyed by fire in 1800.  British and Hessian estimates placed the total American losses at around 3,000, and a return prepared by General Howe listed 1,097 prisoners, including Generals John Sullivan, Lord Stirling, and Nathaniel Woodhull.  Casualty numbers for specific units are rare; historian John Gallagher has compiled a partial listing confirming 1,120 killed or missing, noting that returns for 52 of 70 units under Washington's command are missing.  The Maryland Regiment of William Smallwood was virtually wiped out, suffering 256 killed and more than 100 captured out of a unit numbering nearly 400.  Casualty figures are listed as notes if they are available for a given unit.

Notes

References
 
 
 
 
 
 
 
 
 
 

American Revolutionary War orders of battle
New York (state) in the American Revolution